Sergei Petrovich Tarasov (born 15 February 1965) is a former Russian biathlete. In the 1990s, he was one of the dominating biathletes, winning four Olympic medals and seven World Championship medals over the course of his career.

Albertville incident 
During the 1992 Winter Olympics in Albertville, France, Tarasov became acutely ill and had to be taken to the hospital. Rumours about the cause of his grave medical condition soon started floating around the Olympic village, and was also reported in the press, but the Russian team leaders said he'd suffered kidney failure from eating poisonous mushrooms. Many years later, in 2015, Tarasov gave an interview where he confirmed what many had thought in 1992, his kidney failure was caused by a botched blood transfusion. He'd either gotten someone else's blood, or the blood had not been properly refrigerated during storage. The blood transfusion at the Olympics was done by the team to illegally enhance his performance in the upcoming competitions, but nearly cost him his life.

Biathlon results
All results are sourced from the International Biathlon Union.

Olympic Games
4 medals (1 gold, 1 silver, 2 bronze)

World Championships
9 medals (2 gold, 5 silver, 2 bronze)

*During Olympic seasons competitions are only held for those events not included in the Olympic program.
**Pursuit was added as an event in 1997.

Individual victories
4 victories (3 In, 1 Sp)

*Results are from UIPMB and IBU races which include the Biathlon World Cup, Biathlon World Championships and the Winter Olympic Games.

References

External links
 

1965 births
Living people
Soviet male biathletes
Russian male biathletes
Biathletes at the 1994 Winter Olympics
Biathletes at the 1998 Winter Olympics
Olympic biathletes of Russia
Medalists at the 1994 Winter Olympics
Medalists at the 1998 Winter Olympics
Olympic medalists in biathlon
Olympic bronze medalists for Russia
Olympic silver medalists for Russia
Olympic gold medalists for Russia
Biathlon World Championships medalists
Doping cases in biathlon
Soviet sportspeople in doping cases
Russian sportspeople in doping cases
Sportspeople from Altai Krai